John Anderson (11 October 1921 – 8 August 2006) was an English football player, whose career started in 1946.

Anderson was born in Salford, Lancashire. He played as a midfielder for Manchester United, and helped the club win the FA Cup in 1948 with a goal against Blackpool in the final, a match that is still widely regarded as one of the finest games ever played at Wembley Stadium. Manchester United won 4-2 and this was the first of Stanley Matthews' three cup final appearances for Blackpool. Anderson was transferred to Nottingham Forest in October 1949 before transferring to Peterborough United where upon retiring from playing professional football he was recruited to Posh's backroom staff as trainer/coach. His first-born son John Anderson and family still live in Peterborough although his other siblings all relocated in Manchester.

He died in August 2006, two months before what would have been his 85th birthday.

Honours

As a player 
Manchester United
FA Cup
Winner (1): 1948

1921 births
Footballers from Salford
2006 deaths
English footballers
Manchester United F.C. players
Nottingham Forest F.C. players
Peterborough United F.C. players
English Football League players
Association football wingers
FA Cup Final players